In linguistics, verb phrase ellipsis (VP-ellipsis or VPE) is a type of elliptical construction and a type of anaphora in which a verb phrase has been left out (elided) provided that its antecedent can be found within the same linguistic context. For example, "She will sell sea shells, and he will <sell sea shells> too" is understood as "She will sell sea shells, and he will sell sea shells too". VP-ellipsis is well-studied, particularly with regard to its occurrence in English, although certain types can be found in other languages as well.

VP ellipsis in English

Elided VP introduced by auxiliary verb or infinitive particle 
With English grammar, VP ellipsis must be introduced by an auxiliary verb (be, can, do, don't, could, have, may, might, shall, should, will, won't, would, etc.) or by the infinitive particle to. In the examples below, the elided material of VP ellipsis is indicated using subscripts, strikethrough represents that the material has been moved, the antecedent to the ellipsis is bolded, and asterisk (*) signals an ungrammatical sentence:

   (1a) You might do it, but I won't <do it>.
   (1b) *You might do it, but I <do it>.
 
   (2a) She will not laugh, but he will <laugh>.
   (2b) *She will not laugh, but he <laugh>.
 
   (3a) Susan has been cheating, and Fred has <been cheating> too.
   (3b) *Susan has been cheating, and Fred <been cheating> too.
 
   (4a) Larry is not telling the truth, neither is Jim <telling the truth>.
   (4b) *Larry is not telling the truth, neither Jim <telling the truth>.

Attempts at VP ellipsis that lack an auxiliary verb fail, unless the infinitive particle to is retained:

   (6a) Sam wants to eat, and Fred wants to <eat> also.
   (6b) *Sam wants to eat, and Fred wants <to eat> also.
 
   (7a) Josh likes to sleep late, and Hillary likes to <sleep late> also.
   (7b) *Josh likes to sleep late, and Hillary likes <to sleep late> also.

A particularly frequent construction in which VP ellipsis (obligatorily) occurs is in tag questions:

   (8a) Jeremy likes beer, doesn't he <like beer>?
   (8b) Susan will write the paper, won't she <write the paper>?

Apparent exceptions to the restriction that VP ellipsis can only occur in the context of an auxiliary verb or infinitive particle are analyzed as instances of null complement anaphora:

   (9)   Question: Did you refuse to be promoted?
  Answer: Yes, I refused <to be promoted>.

English VP ellipsis operates forwards or backwards
VP ellipsis can be said to operate either forwards or backwards: it operates forwards when the antecedent to the ellipsis precedes the ellipsis (as in the above examples) and backwards when the antecedent follows the ellipsis. It can also be said to operate either upwards or downwards (or neither). It operates upwards when the antecedent appears in a clause that is subordinate to the clause containing the ellipsis, and downwards when the ellipsis appears in a clause subordinate to the clause containing the antecedent. In the above examples, the two clauses are coordinated, so neither is subordinate to the other, and hence the operation of the ellipsis is neither upward nor downward.

Combinations of these directions of operation of ellipsis are illustrated with the following examples:
 (10a) The people who say they will help never do <help>. - Forwards and upwards
 (10b) The people who say they will <help> never do help. - Backwards and downwards
 
 (11a) The people never do help who they say they will <help>. - Forwards and downwards
 (11b) *The people never do <help> who they say they will help. - Backwards and upward
Three of the four combinations are acceptable. However, as the fourth example shows, VP ellipsis is impossible when it operates both backwards and upwards.

English antecedent-contained ellipsis

An aspect of VP ellipsis that has been the subject of much theoretical analysis occurs when elided VP appears to be contained inside its antecedent. The phenomenon is called antecedent-contained ellipsis or antecedent-contained deletion (ACD). This is displayed in both examples below where the antecedent is represented by bolded font. Canonical cases of antecedent-contained ellipsis occur when the elided material appears inside a quantified object NP. This can be seen in the second example where the quantified object NP is underlined. Quantifiers (ex. every) attach to nouns (ex. thing) to specify a subgroup. The elided material is represented in the same format as previous examples.

  
 (12)   He is thinking the same thing I am <thinking>.
 
 (13)   They said every thing that we did <say>.
ACD unfortunately gives rise to 2 issues. The first is that the elided VP must be parallel, or identical, in form with the antecedent. The second is that since the antecedent contains the VPE site, whenever the antecedent is copied in, the VPE is automatically also included. Combined, these two factors result in an infinite regress:

 (14)   Eventually, Daisy [VP knew how to prepare every dish that her dad did [<know how to prepare every dish that her dad did> [<know how to prepare every dish that her dad did>...]]]

One means of addressing ACD infinite regress that is pursued in some phrase structure grammars is to assume quantifier raising (QR). Quantifier raising involves moving a quantifier to a higher position in the structure, leaving behind a trace which it binds to. Crucially, the landing site of QR in ACD sentences must be below the subject position. It is seen as a covert process because it leaves the spoken word order unchanged. An alternative explanation, pursued in dependency grammars, is to assume that the basic unit of syntax is not the constituent, but rather the catena. With this analysis, the antecedent to the ellipsis does not need to be a complete constituent (an entire verb phrase), but can be merely a catena (the verbs say and thinking in the above examples), which need not contain the ellipsis.

English argument contained ellipsis
As noted above, VP ellipsis is generally impossible if it would operate both backwards and upwards. There are also certain other restrictions on the possibility of ellipsis, although a complete theoretical analysis may be lacking. Two examples of environments in which ellipsis fails are now given:
 (15)   *A proof that God exists does <exist>. - Failed upward ellipsis
 
 (16)   *A proof that God does <exist> exists. - Failed argument-contained ellipsis
The inability of VP ellipsis to occur in these cases has been explored in terms of so-called argument contained ellipsis. The ellipsis appears inside an argument of the predicate represented by the antecedent to the ellipsis. A satisfactory account of the inability of VP ellipsis to occur in these sentences is lacking.

VP ellipsis in language acquisition

Language acquisition often refers to a child learning to speak their first language, which is most often the language of their caregivers. Language acquisition involves many stages of learning—some of which are required before mastery of new information may occur.

Children acquiring VP ellipsis typically go through two stages: in stage one, they use a full sentence; in stage two—after they have mastered intonation and modal auxiliaries—they are able to use VP ellipsis.

Full sentences 

Intonation or inflection on the edge of the phrase marks where the elided material has been deleted from the phonological form: until children master where and how to use intonation in a sentence to mark the elided material, they respond in full sentences.

   
 (21)   I like Linda's cookies and Rebecca likes Linda's cookies too.

Verb phrase ellipsis mastery 

Children master the use of modal auxiliaries before they effectively use verb phrase ellipsis because modal auxiliaries license ellipsis.

 (22)   I like Linda's cookies, and Rebecca does <like Linda's cookies> too.
The above sentence shows the use of both intonation (bold italicized font) and the modal auxiliary (does)--both of which are required for English verb phrase ellipsis.

Intonation on the modal auxiliary marks the edge of the phrase, from which the elided material has been deleted from the phonological form: that is, although the elided material remains in the logical form, it is not in the phonological form.

Despite using fewer words than a complete sentence, a sentence which employs verb phrase ellipsis requires more steps to be understood. This complexity is due to the processing challenges involved with referring back to the unpronounced syntactic structure.

See also

Catena
Constituent
Antecedent-contained deletion
Dependency grammar
Ellipsis
Phrase structure grammar

References

Notes

Syntax
Generative syntax
English grammar